W W Warner may refer to:

Bill Warner (motorcycle racer) (1969 - 2013), American motorcycle racer
William Ward Warner (1867 - 1950), British military officer and politician
William W. Warner (1920 – 2008), American biologist and writer